J.A. "Judith" Merkies (born 28 September 1966 in London, Ontario, Canada) is a Dutch politician for the Labour Party (Partij van de Arbeid - PvdA) who served as a Member of the European Parliament from 2009 until 2014.

Merkies graduated with a law degree from the University of Amsterdam and pursued a career as a lawyer before taking on post-graduate studies in European and International Law at the same university. Merkies has worked for the institutions of the European Union as well as for various industries. Prior to becoming a Member of the European Parliament Merkies worked as a Project Manager for the Education, Audiovisual & Culture Executive Agency (EACEA) of the European Commission. From 2005 to 2006 she worked as an executive manager at the European Music Office, an international non-profit association bringing together professional organizations, associations and federations from the music sector within the European Union. From 2000 to 2004 she worked as a representative of professionals and companies in the Dutch film industry.

Judith Merkies is a sister of SP politician Arnold Merkies.

References
  Parlement.com biography
  European Parliament

1966 births
Living people
Dutch civil servants
Dutch women in politics
Labour Party (Netherlands) MEPs
MEPs for the Netherlands 2009–2014
21st-century women MEPs for the Netherlands
Politicians from London, Ontario
University of Amsterdam alumni